The Gila River War Relocation Center was an American concentration camp in Arizona, one of several built by the War Relocation Authority (WRA) during the Second World War for the incarceration of Japanese Americans from the West Coast. With a peak population of 13,348, it became the fourth-largest city in the state, operating from May 1942 to November 16, 1945.

Internment 
The rationale for internment was brought on under the pretext of sabotage of the West Coast by the large Japanese American population. Immediately following the attack on Pearl Harbor, President Franklin D. Roosevelt issued Executive Order 9066. This order was Roosevelt's authorization to hand authority to the Secretary of War and military commanders to designate areas to detain people living in the United States whom may be a threat to the country and its interests. Though it never specifically named Japanese Americans (or anyone of Japanese ancestry) to be detained, it was outwardly implied due to the outbreak of war with Japan. The Secretary of War was also told to supply accommodations to people who are held by the government. The order stated: "The Secretary of War is hereby authorized to provide for residents of any such area who are excluded therefrom, such transportation, food, shelter, and other accommodations as may be necessary". The order also gave authority of the prescribed areas to the Secretary of War ahead of other departments in the government and allowed the use of federal troops to enforce compliance with government rules in those areas. Placed in command of issuing the forced removal of Japanese Americans from their homes and businesses in the West Coast was commander of the Western Defense Command Lt. Gen. John L. DeWitt. The internment camps were hastily constructed within a few months after the issue of the order. Living quarters across all camps resembled military style barracks as they were constructed from military surplus equipment. Living space was generally tight and incredibly cramped among families.

The forced removal of Japanese Americans from the "affected areas" of California, Oregon, Washington, and Arizona started from April to May 1942. Families were given just under one week to get their personal and professional affairs in order. As a result, individual families lost thousands of dollars from having to hastily sell off properties severely under market value. After the war, many Japanese Americans who were interned had to completely start over in building their businesses and livelihoods from scratch. In the 1980s, the federal government acknowledged that it had committed an injustice against Japanese Americans with this act. Congress passed the Civil Liberties Act of 1988, an official apology and authorization to provide restitution to survivors and descendants of inmates. In total 119,000 Americans of Japanese descent were incarcerated throughout World War II.

Camp history

Gila River War Relocation Center was one of ten internment camps, operated by the WRA located throughout the American interior west. The Gila River camp was one of two internment camps located in Arizona, the other being Poston War Relocation Center. Most camps including Gila River were chosen due to their solitary geographic locations, many of which were located in the middle of deserts. The camp was located on the Gila River Indian Reservation, near an irrigated agricultural center. It comprised two separate camps, named 'Canal' and 'Butte'. Construction began on May 1, 1942, over the strong objections of the reservation's Pima Indian government. The official opening took place less than two months later, on July 20. Canal Camp closed on September 28, 1945. Butte Camp was shut down on November 10, 1945; and the Gila River Relocation Center was officially closed on November 16, 1945.

Gila River received incarcerees from California (Fresno, Sacramento, and Los Angeles).  In addition, it took in 2,000 people from the Jerome War Relocation Center in Arkansas when that facility closed in 1944. It became Arizona's fourth-largest city, with a peak population of 13,348.

Some of the incarcerees died en route to Gila River or shortly after arrival in the harsh desert environment. One of these was the mother of Iva Toguri. Toguri was an American woman of Japanese descent who broadcast for the Japanese and was later condemned as "Tokyo Rose"; she was convicted of treason, based on perjured testimony.

Gila River was considered one of the least oppressive camps of its kind. It had only a single watchtower, and its fences were among the few that lacked barbed wire.  The administrators of the camps seemed to care for the incarcerees, and allowed them access to the amenities of Phoenix. Gila River was one of the first WRA camps to have a local "democratic" governing body of internees for the camp, supervised closely by the WRA. A representative of every block was nominated to the council however, only Nisei (second generation U.S born Japanese Americans) were allowed to hold the offices. They also encouraged recreational activities such as sports and arts. Butte camp contained a 6,000-seat baseball field, designed by Kenichi Zenimura, a professional baseball player, and considered to be the best in the WRA system. Incarcerees also built a theater for plays and films, and playgrounds, and planted trees to relieve the desolation of the arid site.  Gila River had a communal medical facility at Butte Hospital.

Canal Camp had 404 buildings with 232 barracks and 24 separate schoolhouses.  Butte Camp contained 821 buildings with 627 residential barracks.  These barracks were made of wood and fireproof shingles that were of limited effectiveness in blocking out the desert heat.  Each barrack was made to house four single families in separate apartments. But, the camp exceeded its capacity: it was designed for 10,000 residents, and held more than 13,000.  Because of this, some families were housed in the mess hall or recreation buildings, where they had to use hanging blankets as makeshift walls for visual privacy. Water shortages also plagued the camp. Inmates' encounters with venomous rattlesnakes and scorpions resulted in bites that kept Butte Hospital extremely busy.

The land for the camp sites is owned by the Gila River Indian Tribe and is considered sacred by them. They have restricted public access to the historic sites. All the main structures are long gone. Remaining are such elements as the road grid, concrete slab foundations, manholes, cisterns, several rock alignments, and dozens of small ponds.

During the Ronald Reagan Administration, the federal government acknowledged that it had committed an injustice against Japanese Americans with this program. Congress passed a resolution of official apology and authorization to provide compensation to survivors and descendants of inmates. On December 21, 2006, President George W. Bush signed H.R. 1492 into law guaranteeing $38,000,000 in federal money to restore the Gila River relocation center, along with nine other former American concentration camps used to house Japanese Americans.

Notable internees

 George Aratani (1917–2013), an entrepreneur and philanthropist
 Harry K. Fukuhara (1920–2015), inducted in the United States Military Intelligence Hall of Fame
 Evelyn Nakano Glenn (b. 1940), a professor of Gender & Women Studies and of Ethnic Studies at the University of California, Berkeley and founding director of the Center for Race and Gender (CRG).  Also interned at Heart Mountain.
 Masumi Hayashi (1945–2006), an American photographer and artist
 George Hoshida (1907–1985), a Japanese American artist who made drawings of his experience during his incarceration in three internment camps.  Also interned at Jerome
 Dale Ishimoto (1923–2004), an American actor
 Toichiro Kawai (1861-1943), a carpenter known for building the moon bridge and bell tower at the Japanese Garden of the Huntington Library
 Yuriko Kikuchi (1920–2022), an American dancer and choreographer
 Jay Kazuo Kochi (1927–2008), a physical organic chemist
 Tetsu Komai (1894–1970), an American actor
 Tomoko Miho (1931–2012), a designer and recipient of the 1993 AIGA Medal
 Noriyuki "Pat" Morita (1932–2005), an American actor known for roles on Happy Days and in the Karate Kid movies.  Also interned at Tule Lake
 Paul Osumi (19051996), Japanese Christian minister
 Ken and Miye Ota (1923–2015 and b. 1918 respectively), a married couple known for teaching martial arts, ballroom dancing, and social graces at their cultural school
 Kazuo Otani (1918–1944), a United States Army soldier and a recipient of the Medal of Honor
 Shoji Sadao (1927–2019), an architect
 Reiko Sato (1931–1981), an American dancer and actress
 Miiko Taka (1925–2023), an American actress
 Nao Takasugi (1922–2009), an American politician
 James Takemori (1926–2015), an American judoka and World War II veteran
 Daisho Tana (1901–1972), a Buddhist missionary and leader of the Palo Alto Buddhist Temple
 Paul Terasaki (1929–2016), organ transplant scientist and Professor Emeritus of Surgery at UCLA School of Medicine
 Michi Nishiura Weglyn (1926–1999), author of Years of Infamy: The Untold Story of America’s Concentration Camps
 Kenichi Zenimura (1900–1968), a baseball player and manager

Gallery

See also

 Densho: The Japanese American Legacy Project
 Other camps:
 Granada War Relocation Center
 Heart Mountain War Relocation Center
 Jerome War Relocation Center
 Manzanar National Historic Site
 Minidoka National Historic Site
 Poston War Relocation Center
 Rohwer War Relocation Center
 Topaz War Relocation Center
 Tule Lake War Relocation Center

References

External links 

 Gila River Relocation Center records, 1942–1945, The Bancroft Library
 War Relocation Camps in Arizona 1942–1946
 Photo of Eleanor Roosevelt visiting the camp
 Gila River Relocation Center
 NPS's Gila River page
 
 A Diamond in the Desert written by Kathryn Fitzmaurice
 

Landmarks in Arizona
Internment camps for Japanese Americans
Buildings and structures in Pinal County, Arizona
History of Pinal County, Arizona
Government of Pinal County, Arizona
1942 establishments in Arizona
1945 disestablishments in Arizona